Nhoah (born 1961; stylized as NHOAH) is a German music producer, composer, DJ and artist who lives and works in Berlin and Vienna.

Early life and career 

In 1980, Nhoah played the drums in various local bands in Berlin (i.a. Aeroflot, Komeda Artist) and worked alongside numerous international artists who resided in the city (e.g., Jayne County, Romy Haag, Hot Java).

Around this time electronic means of music production gained momentum and computationally derived sounds began to influence his work significantly. He continued to compose, produce and engineer musical content (e.g., for Larry Steinbacheck/Bronski Beat, Gareth Jones, Rio Reiser, Marianne Rosenberg) working mainly in Hansa Tonstudio and Tritonus Studio Berlin.

Several contract works followed (i.a. The Pogues, Peacock Palace, David Hasselhoff).

In 1998, he founded the record label and artist management company R.O.T respectortolerate to support and mentor the development of artistic talent from which multiple successful projects originated (e.g., MIA., The Aim of Design Is to Define Space, Schlindwein, Lulu Schmidt).

In 2011, the first album of his project Tangowerk by Nhoah was released. It mirrors musical influences from the notorious electro clubs of Berlin and tango orchestra from Buenos Aires. Many of the contributors are internationally recognised artists such as Adriana Varela, Louie Austen, Berlin Comedian Harmonists, Mieze Katz (from MIA.), Walter "Chino" Laborde, Ina Viola or Lulu Schmidt. The project also features elaborate visuals (video: Carola Schmidt), a complimentary movie and a stage play are in the making<ref name="tagesspiegel_4222518" /. The album Tangowerk was nominated for the German Record Critics' Award Preis der deutschen Schallplattenkritik.

Nhoah received various gold and platinum awards for his productions. His work includes collaborations with the producers of The Eurythmics, Depeche Mode and Bronski Beat's Larry Steinbachek.

Since 2017, NHOAH has performed as a live-act and DJ. Since then, he released one studio album, several EP's and a live album with electronic music. Mainly in the genres Techno, Deep House and Electronica.

Spanning over decades, Nhoah's comprehensive body of work continues to garner the recognition of publications such as Resident Advisor, The Quietus, TRAX Mag, Clash Mag, PopMatters, Data Transmission, The Arts Desk, Be at TV, Electronic Groove and BBC 6 Music's Nemone.

Productions 
Nhoah's recent releases include his debut album West-Berlin (2018), featuring remixes from the likes of 808 State and μ-Ziq.

Following the Be at TV premiere of 'Stairway To Nothingness – Glacier Concert' (2019), a live video was recorded on a suspended glass stairway at 9000 feet, on the highest mountain of Styria, Austria: the Dachstein Glacier.

Albums (selected)

Singles (selected)

Soundtracks (selected)

Other works 
Together with Carola Schmidt, he received the short film newcomer award of the Diagonale (Filmfestival) 2008 in Austria, for the short film: "Wir bitten dich, verführe uns!".

Under the pseudonym H.Flug, he applies himself as a photographer, painter and writer, exhibiting his works in renowned galleries and exhibitions and frequently collaborating with visual and performance artists (i.a. Eric Tannhäuser, Carola Schmidt).

References

External links 
 Official Homepage
 Tangowerk Official Homepage
 Tangowerk on Wikipedia
 Nhoah Hoena at Discogs.com

German male writers
German male musicians
German composers
German record producers
Musicians from Berlin
German music managers
German songwriters
1961 births
Living people